The National Board of Review Award for Best Supporting Actress is one of the annual film awards given (since 1954) by the National Board of Review of Motion Pictures.

Winners

1950s

1960s

1970s

1980s

1990s

2000s

2010s

2020s

Multiple awards

2 wins
 Kathy Bates (2002, 2019)
 Edith Evans (1959, 1964)
 Angela Lansbury (1962, 1978)
 Winona Ryder (1990, 1993)

See also
 New York Film Critics Circle Award for Best Supporting Actress
 National Society of Film Critics Award for Best Supporting Actress
 Los Angeles Film Critics Association Award for Best Supporting Actress

References

National Board of Review Awards
Film awards for supporting actress
Awards established in 1954
1954 establishments in the United States